Rose Catherine Lettitia Matafeo (born 25 February 1992) is a New Zealand comedian, actress and TV presenter. She was a writer and performer on the New Zealand late-night comedy sketch show Funny Girls. In 2018, she won the Edinburgh Comedy Award for Best Show at the Edinburgh Festival Fringe for her show Horndog.

Early life
Matafeo grew up in Ponsonby, Auckland, and attended Auckland Girls' Grammar School, where she was head girl. She has two older brothers. Her father is Samoan and her mother is of Scottish and Croatian heritage. Her parents are Rastafarians and belong to the Twelve Tribes of Israel denomination.  Matafeo has described her upbringing as "quite relaxed".

At the age of 15, Matafeo started doing stand-up comedy through the platform of the "Class Comedians" programme put on by the New Zealand Comedy Trust, and went on to win the "Nailed It on the Night" award at the New Zealand International Comedy Festival in 2007. She's been a regular at the festival since.

Career
Since graduating from the "Class Comedians" programme, Matafeo went on to win best newcomer at the 2010 New Zealand International Comedy Festival. She became a host of the popular comedy festival show "Fanfiction Comedy" in 2012. She has had success with her solo stand-up comedy shows at the festival: Life Lessons I've Learnt from the 60s Based on Things I've Seen on Television (2011), Scout's Honour (2012) and The Rose Matafeo Variety Hour (2013).

Matafeo won the Billy T Award, which recognises the potential of up-and-coming New Zealand comedians, for The Rose Matafeo Variety Hour in 2013, having previously been nominated for her show Scout's Honour in 2012. Her 2014 show at the festival was titled Pizza Party. In 2015, she performed a duo show at the Edinburgh Festival Fringe with Guy Montgomery titled Rose Matafeo and Guy Montgomery Are Friends. On 25 August 2018, Matafeo won the Edinburgh Comedy Award for Best Show at the Edinburgh Festival Fringe, for her show Horndog, collecting a £10,000 prize. She was the first person of colour to win the prestigious award for a solo show, and the first New Zealander. Only four other female solo stand-up comedians had won the award before her.

She was a TV presenter and host of U Live, which ran on the TVNZ U channel from 13 March 2011 until 31 August 2013, when the channel came to an end. Upon TVNZ U finishing, she took on a new role as a writer for Jono and Ben at Ten, a satirical news and comedy sketch show. Matafeo co-created and starred in the New Zealand sketch comedy show Funny Girls for three seasons from 2015 until 2018. She has been playing the role of Talia in the ABC comedy Squinters since 2018.

Matafeo appeared on Jon Richardson: Ultimate Worrier as an investigator into worrisome topics, and also appeared with Richardson in 8 Out of 10 Cats Does Countdown (S19, Ep1), for Channel 4 TV in January 2020. She was a contestant on series three of Richard Osman's House of Games and the ninth series of Taskmaster.

Having toured as a stand-up comedian for ten years, Matafeo said in 2018 that she wanted to "take a break from hour long comedy" and instead act more, write more, and also direct. Matafeo went on to serve as director on five episodes of the 2019 New Zealand TV comedy Golden Boy.

Matafeo had her US television debut as a comedian on Conan O'Brien's talk show Conan on TBS on 9 May 2019.

In 2019, Matafeo appeared on Josh Widdicombe's show Hypothetical on Dave.

She currently hosts the podcast Boners of the Heart with comedian and writer Alice Snedden on the Little Empire Podcast Network. She was a guest on Deborah Frances-White's The Guilty Feminist podcast and on the RHLSTP podcast with Richard Herring.

In 2019, Matafeo tried her hand at directing for the first time and directed a couple of episodes in the first season of a New Zealand sitcom called Golden Boy for TV3. In 2020, she returned to the set of Golden Boy in the second season as one of the supporting cast.

In July 2020, Matafeo joined Guy Montgomery on the comedy show Tiny Tour of Aotearoa travelling across New Zealand.  

On 20 August 2020, Matafeo's comedy special Horndog was released on HBO Max.

In March 2019, it was announced that Matafeo had been cast as the lead in her first feature film, Baby Done. Her co-star is Matthew Lewis, who played Neville Longbottom in the Harry Potter film series. The comedy film is executive-produced by Thor: Ragnarok and Hunt for the Wilderpeople director Taika Waititi and was released in 2020.

In April 2021, Starstruck, a six-part rom-com created by and starring Matefeo aired on the BBC (UK), HBO (USA) and TVNZ (New Zealand). Co-written by Matafeo and Alice Snedden, the cast included actor Nikesh Patel, as leading man and love interest Tom. Filming for the first series was delayed due to the COVID pandemic, however a second series of the show was commissioned before the first series had even begun filming.

Personal life
Matafeo lives partly in London. When she first moved to the UK in 2015, she shared a flat in Shepherd's Bush with comedian Nish Kumar for a while, before moving in with her then-boyfriend, comedian James Acaster. Matafeo was in a relationship with Acaster from 2014 to 2017. 

She is a fan of Burt Bacharach and named her cat "Bert Bachacat" after him.

One of Matafeo's interests is mukbang videos (in which the host eats large amounts of food while interacting with the audience), so in July 2018 she decided to make her own mukbang video using takeaways purchased from Double Happy Takeaways in Auckland. It was featured on The Spinoff.

Matafeo is a supporter of the Green Party of Aotearoa New Zealand and was scheduled to host their campaign launch for the 2020 general election, but was later asked to step down from the role. The Green Party said this was due to a miscommunication within the party.

Filmography

Film

Television

References

External links
 
 
 
 CV at agents' website

Living people
1992 births
21st-century comedians
Actresses of Samoan descent
New Zealand comedians
New Zealand expatriates in England
New Zealand people of Croatian descent
New Zealand people of Samoan descent
New Zealand people of Scottish descent
New Zealand podcasters
New Zealand stand-up comedians
New Zealand women comedians
New Zealand women podcasters
People educated at Auckland Girls' Grammar School
People from Auckland